Zoran Živković (Serbian Cyrillic: Зоран Живковић, pronounced , born October 5, 1948) is a Serbian writer, university professor, essayist, researcher, publisher and translator. Žiković's works have been translated to 20 languages and he was awarded World Fantasy Award.

Biography
In 1973, Zoran Živković graduated in literary theory from the Department of Comparative Literature in the Faculty of Philology at the University of Belgrade. He received his master's degree in 1979 with the work “Anthropomorphism and the motif of the first contact in the works of Arthur C. Clarke” ("Antropomorfizam i motiv prvog kontakta u delima Artura Klarka") and his doctorate in 1982 from the same university. His dissertation was "The Appearance of Science Fiction as a Genre of Artistic Prose" ("Nastanak naučne fantastike kao žanra umetničke proze").

From the mid-seventies to the early nineties Živković was widely involved with science fiction. Apart from his two theses, he was a publisher (founding the Polaris imprint, through which he released over two hundred books), a translator (translating more than 70 books, mostly from English), an essayist (four of Živković's books of essays appeared in this period), a researcher (producing a large, richly illustrated, two-volume Encyclopedia of Science Fiction) and a TV host (he wrote and hosted a television series about science fiction cinema, titled The Starry Screen).

From the mid-nineties onward, Živković discontinued his engagement in SF and turned entirely to writing non-generic fiction. (In this capacity he defines himself as "a writer without any prefixes – a humble practitioner of the ancient and noble art of prose.") An early agent of his suggested Živković publish under the name "Donald Livingston," to make his work more marketable in the U.S., a suggestion which Živković rejected. Between 1993 and early 2016 he wrote 21 books of fiction which were published in 81 foreign editions, 20 languages and 23 countries.

Živković has won several literary awards for his fiction. In 1994 his novel The Fourth Circle won the "Miloš Crnjanski" award. In 2003, Živković's mosaic novel The Library won a "World Fantasy Award" for Best Novella. In 2007 his novel The Bridge won the "Isidora Sekulić" award. In 2007 Živković received the "Stefan Mitrov Ljubiša" award for his life achievement in literature. In 2014 and 2015 Živković received three awards for his contribution to the literature of fantastika: "Art-Anima", "Stanislav Lem" and "The Golden Dragon".

In 2005, Belgrade TV station Studio B produced The Collector (Sakupljač) TV series, based upon Živković's mosaic novel Twelve Collections. In 2007, notable Serbian film author Puriša Đorđević directed the film Two (Dva), based on Živković's fictional themes.

Two of Živković's stories were produced as radio broadcasts by the BBC: "The Train" (2005) and "Alarm Clock on the Night Table" (2007).

The prestigious US literary magazine World Literature Today brought a special section on Živković's writing in the November/December 2011 issue.

From 2007 to 2017, Živković was a professor in the Faculty of Philology at the University of Belgrade where he taught Creative Writing. He was initiator of the Workshop for Creative Writing (Radionica za kreativnog pisanja „PričArt”) in 2011.

In 2019 his collected works have been published in English in the USA.

As of 2020 his works have been translated to 20 languages.

Bibliography

Fiction
 The Fourth Circle (Četvrti krug, 1993.)
 Time Gifts (Vremenski darovi, 1997.)
 The Writer (Pisac, 1998.)
 The Book (Knjiga, 1999.)
 Impossible Encounters (Nemogući susreti, 2000.)
 Seven Touches of Music (Sedam dodira muzike, 2001.)
 The Library (Biblioteka, 2002.)
 Steps through the Mist (Koraci kroz maglu, 2003.)
 Hidden Camera (Skrivena kamera, 2003.)
 Compartments (Vagon, 2004.)
 Four Stories till the End (Četiri priče do kraja, 2004.)
 Twelve Collections and The Teashop (Dvanaest zbirki i Čajdžinica, 2005.)
 The Bridge (Most, 2006.)
 Miss Tamara, The Reader (Čitateljka, 2006.)
 Amarcord (Amarkord, 2007.)
 The Last Book (Poslednja knjiga, 2007.)
 Escher's Loops (Esherove petlje, 2008.)
 The Ghostwriter (Pisac u najam, 2009.)
 The Five Wonders of the Danube (Pet dunavskih čuda, 2011.)
 The Grand Manuscript (Nađi me, 2012.)
 The Compendium of the Dead (Zbornik mrtvih, 2015.)
 The Image Interpreter (Tumač fotografija, 2016.)
 The White Room (Bela soba, 2021.)

Nonfiction
 Contemporaries of the Future (Savremenici budućnosti, 1983)
 The Starry Screen (Zvezdani ekran, 1984)
 First Contact (Prvi kontakt, 1985)
 The Encyclopedia of Science Fiction I-II (Enciklopedija naučne fantastike I-II, 1990)
 Essays on Science Fiction (Ogledi o naučnoj fantastici, 1995)
 On Genre and Writing (O žanru i pisanju, 2010)
 The Clay Writer: Shaping in Creative Writing (Pisac od gline — oblikovati u kreativnom pisanju, 2013)
 Challenges of Fantastika (2013)

Anthologies edited
 The Devil in Brisbane (2005)
 Fantastical Journeys to Brisbane (2007)

Critical Editions
 Dostoyevsky's Demons (Zli dusi, Dostojevski, 2021)

Awards
Miloš Crnjanski Award
World Fantasy Award
Isidora Sekulić Award
Stefan Mitrov Ljubiša Award
Art-Anima Award
Stanislav Lem Award
Dublin Literary Award

References

External links
 Official web site
 Talented Dreamer, an appreciation of the fiction of Zoran Živković by Tamar Yellin
Awards nominations

Nonfiction
 The Motif of First Contact in Arthur C. Clarke's SF Works, an excerpt from Zoran Živković's Master's thesis at Fantastic Metropolis
 Utopia in Childhood's End by Arthur C. Clarke, at Fantastic Metropolis

Interviews
 World Literature Today, November–December 2011
 Boomtron.com, from 2007.

1948 births
Living people
Serbian male short story writers
Serbian short story writers
World Fantasy Award-winning writers
Serbian novelists
Serbian science fiction writers
Serbian literary critics
University of Belgrade Faculty of Philology alumni
Writers from Belgrade